Penelope (Ancient Greek: Πηνελόπεια, Pēnelópeia, or , Pēnelópē) is a character in Homer's Odyssey. She was the queen of Ithaca and was the daughter of Spartan king Icarius and naiad Periboea. Penelope is known for her fidelity to  her husband Odysseus, despite the attention of more than a hundred  suitors during his absence. In one source, Penelope's original name was Arnacia or Arnaea.

Etymology 
Glossed by Hesychius as "some kind of bird" (today arbitrarily identified with the Eurasian wigeon, to which Linnaeus gave the binomial Anas penelope), where  is a common Pre-Greek suffix for predatory animals; however, the semantic relation between the proper name and the gloss is not clear.

Role in the Odyssey 

Penelope is married to the main character, the king of Ithaca, Odysseus (Ulysses in Roman mythology), and daughter of Icarius of Sparta and Periboea (or Polycaste). She only has one son with Odysseus, Telemachus, who was born just before Odysseus was called to fight in the Trojan War. She waits twenty years for Odysseus' return, during which time she devises various cunning strategies to delay marrying any of the 108 suitors (led by Antinous and including Agelaus, Amphinomus, Ctessippus, Demoptolemus, Elatus, Euryades, Eurymachus and Peisandros).

On Odysseus's return, disguised as an old beggar, he finds that Penelope has remained faithful. She has devised tricks to delay the suitors, one of which is to pretend to be weaving a burial shroud for Odysseus's elderly father Laertes and claiming that she will choose a suitor when she has finished. Every night for three years, she undoes part of the shroud, until Melantho, a slave, discovers her chicanery and reveals it to the suitors.

Penelope's efforts to delay remarriage is often seen as a symbol of marital fidelity to her husband, Odysseus. But because Athena wants her "to show herself to the wooers, that she might set their hearts a-flutter and win greater honor from her husband and her son than heretofore", Penelope does eventually appear before the suitors  Irene de Jong wrote

 As so often, it is Athena who takes the initiative in giving the story a new direction ... Usually the motives of mortal and god coincide, here they do not: Athena wants Penelope to fan the Suitors’ desire for her and (thereby) make her more esteemed by her husband and son; Penelope has no real motive ... she simply feels an unprecedented impulse to meet the men she so loathes ... adding that she might take this opportunity to talk to Telemachus (which she will indeed do).

It is important to consider the alternate perspective of Penelope entertaining, and even enjoying the attention of, her suitors. Italian philosophy historian Giula Sissa offers a unique perspective which supports this idea. The Odyssey allows room for Penelope’s identity free of being Ulysses’ wife. As she awaits his return, she makes a plan to deal with her suitors while also responding to her desires. Sissa discusses how Penelope gives her suitors the opportunity to demonstrate themselves as the best candidate for her attention. Sissa writes,

"Penelope innovates. And she does so because she responds in the same register to the desires of the men who have been awaiting her verdict for three years. This is an erotic desire to which she reacts, first, with seductive wiles of messages and promises, and then by inviting them to demonstrate their excellence, not in terms of wealth and social prestige, but in terms of something extremely personal and physical. In order to please Penelope, they have to be on par with Ulysses in showing the might of their bodies."

She is ambivalent, variously asking Artemis to kill her and apparently considering marrying one of the suitors. When the disguised Odysseus returns, she announces in her long interview with him that whoever can string Odysseus's rigid bow and shoot an arrow through twelve axe heads may have her hand. "For the plot of the Odyssey, of course, her decision is the turning point, the move that makes possible the long-predicted triumph of the returning hero".

There is debate as to whether Penelope knows that it is Odysseus. Penelope and the suitors know that Odysseus (were he in fact present) would easily surpass them all in any test of masculine skill, so she may have started the contest as an opportunity for him to reveal his identity. On the other hand, because Odysseus seems to be the only person (except, perhaps, Telemachus) who can actually use the bow, she could just be further delaying her marriage to one of the suitors.

When the contest of the bow begins, none of the suitors are able to string the bow, except Odysseus who wins the contest. Having done so, he proceeds to slaughter the suitors – beginning with Antinous whom he finds drinking from his cup – with help from Telemachus, Athena and the slaves Eumaeus the swineherd and Philoetius the cowherd. Odysseus has now revealed himself in all his glory (with a little makeover by Athena); yet Penelope cannot believe that her husband has really returned – she fears that it is perhaps some god in disguise, as in the story of Alcmene – and tests him by ordering her slave Eurycleia to move the bed in their bridal-chamber. Odysseus protests that this cannot be done, since he made the bed himself and knows that one of its legs is a living olive tree. Penelope finally accepts that he truly is Odysseus, a moment that highlights their homophrosýnē ("like-mindedness"). Homer implies that from then on Odysseus would live a long and happy life together with Penelope and Telemachus, wisely ruling his kingdom, and enjoying wide respect and much success.

In some early sources such as Pindar, Pan's parents are Apollo and Penelope. Herodotus, Cicero, Apollodorus, and Hyginus all describe Hermes and Penelope as his parents. Pausanias records the story that Penelope had in fact been unfaithful to Odysseus, who banished her to Mantineia upon his return. In the 5th century AD Nonnus names Pan's mother as Penelope of Mantineia in Arcadia. Other sources report that Penelope had slept with all 108 suitors in Odysseus' absence, and gave birth to Pan as a result. This myth reflects the folk etymology that equates Pan's name with the Greek word for "all". The Odyssey carefully suppresses this variant tradition.

Iconography 

Penelope is recognizable in Greek and Roman works, from Attic vase-paintings—the Penelope Painter is recognized by his representations of her—to Roman sculptures copying or improvising upon classical Greek models, by her seated pose, by her reflective gesture of leaning her cheek on her hand, and by her protectively crossed knees, reflecting her long chastity in Odysseus' absence, an unusual pose in any other figure.

Latin tradition 
Latin references to Penelope revolved around her sexual loyalty to the absent Odysseus. It suited the marital aspect of Roman society representing the tranquility of the worthy family.  She is mentioned by various classical authors including Plautus,  Propertius, Horace, Ovid, Martial and Statius.  The use of Penelope in Latin texts provided a basis for her ongoing use in the Middle Ages and Renaissance as a representation of a chaste wife. This was reinforced by her being named by Saint Jerome among pagan women famed for their chastity.

Notes

References

Primary sources 
 Homer, Odyssey
 Ovid, Heroides I
 Lactantius Placidus, Commentarii in Statii Thebaida

Secondary sources 
 Amory, Anne (1963), ‘The reunion of Odysseus and Penelope’, in Charles H. Taylor (ed.) Essays on the Odyssey: Selected Modern Criticism. Bloomington: Indiana University Press, pp. 100–36.
 Clayton, Barbara (2004), A Penelopean Poetics: Reweaving the Feminine in Homer's Odyssey. Lanham, Maryland and Oxford: Lexington Books.
 Cohen, Beth (1995, ed.), The Distaff Side: Representing the Female in Homer's Odyssey. New York and Oxford: Oxford University Press.
 Doherty, Lillian E. (1995), Siren Songs: Gender, Audiences, and Narrators in the Odyssey. Ann Arbor: University of Michigan Press.
 Felson, Nancy (1994). Regarding Penelope: From Character to Poetics. Princeton, NJ: Princeton University Press.
 Finley, M.I. The World of Odysseus, London. Pelican Books (1962).
 Hall, Edith (2008), The Return of Ulysses: A Cultural History of Homer's Odyssey. London and New York: I. B. Tauris.
 Heilbrun, Carolyn G. (1991), ‘What was Penelope unweaving?’, in Heilbrun, Hamlet's Mother and Other Women: Feminist Essays on Literature. London: The Women's Press, pp. 103–11.
 Heitman, Richard (2005), Taking her Seriously: Penelope and the Plot of Homer's Odyssey. Ann Arbor: Michigan University Press. .
 Katz, Marylin Arthur (1991), Penelope's Renown: Meaning and Indeterminacy in the Odyssey. Princeton: Princeton University Press.
 Marquardt, Patricia A. (1985), ‘Penelope “ΠΟΛΥΤΡΟΠΟΣ”’, American Journal of Philology 106, 32-48.
 Nelson, Thomas J. (2021), ‘Intertextual Agōnes in Archaic Greek Epic: Penelope vs. the Catalogue of Women’, Yearbook of Ancient Greek Epic 5, 25–57.
 Reece, Steve, "Penelope's ‘Early Recognition’ of Odysseus from a Neoanalytic and Oral Perspective," College Literature 38.2 (2011) 101-117. Penelopes_Early_Recognition_of_Odysseus
 Roisman, Hanna M. (1987), ‘Penelope's indignation’, Transactions of the American Philological Association 117, 59-68.
 Schein, Seth L. (1996, ed.), Reading the Odyssey: Selected Interpretive Essays. Princeton: Princeton University Press. 
 Wohl, Victoria Josselyn (1993), ‘Standing by the stathmos: the creation of sexual ideology in the Odyssey’, Arethusa 26, 19-50.
 Zeitlin, Froma (1996). 'Figuring fidelity in Homer's Odyssey in Froma Zeitlin, Playing the Other: Gender and Society in Classical Greek Literature. Chicago: University of Chicago Press. pp. 19–52.
 Zerba, Michelle (2009), ‘What Penelope knew: doubt and scepticism in the Odyssey’, Classical Quarterly 59, 295-316.

External links 

 Odyssey in English on the Perseus Project
 Penelope Unravelling Her Web – a painting of Penelope by Joseph Wright of Derby (from the Getty Museum)
 Penelope and the Suitors, a painting by John William Waterhouse; explore other paintings depicting Penelope

Princesses in Greek mythology
Queens in Greek mythology
Characters in the Odyssey
Laconian characters in Greek mythology
Textiles in folklore